The Stichting Academisch Erfgoed (SAE), in English the Dutch Foundation for Academic Heritage, is a network of Dutch universities that supports these universities' heritage and cultural collections.

Mission 
The Dutch Foundation for Academic Heritage helps to protect university heritage, to make it more accessible and known to the public.

History 
The SAE was founded in 1997, when Dutch State Secretary Aad Nuis reserved a subsidy of 12 million guilders via the Mondriaan Stichting. At that point, a plan was developed for future maintenance and management of the universities' collections. The SAE then made a first selection of valuable and save-worthy collections and objects, developed first guidelines to use these collections in education and research, and to make them better available for the broad public.

The SAE has initiated various thematic projects, about botanical, medical and geological collections. In 2012, the SAE also launched a shared collection website for academic heritage.

Members

 Universiteit van Amsterdam
 Delft University of Technology
 Eindhoven University of Technology
 University of Groningen
 Leiden University
 Maastricht University
 Radboud University Nijmegen
 Free University of Amsterdam
 Utrecht University
 Wageningen UR
Museum Boerhaave participates as an associate member.

External links 
 Stichting Academisch Erfgoed
 Academische Collecties

Further reading

References

Educational organisations based in the Netherlands
1997 establishments in the Netherlands
Organizations established in 1997